Linda France is a British poet, writer and editor. She has published eight full-length poetry collections, a number of pamphlets, and was editor of the influential anthology, Sixty Women Poets. France is the author of The Toast of the Kit-Cat Club,  a verse biography of the eighteenth-century traveler and social rebel, Lady Mary Wortley Montagu. She has won numerous awards and fellowships, including the National Poetry Competition in 2013.

Early life and education 
Linda France was born in Wallsend, Newcastle upon Tyne on 21 May 1958. When France was five years old, her family moved to Dorset, when her father's employer established a new paint manufacturing business. In an interview in 2016, France revealed that moving to Dorset, with its own unique dialect, was an influential moment in her life. She stated: "The effect of that linguistic shift made a writer out of me – the shedding of my native tongue (Geordie), and the language of the hearth to try to belong 'elsewhere' snapped a root that could never be mended and kept me, like most writers, on the edge, always the observer, the listener."

France attended the University of Leeds, studying English and History. After graduating, France lived in London and later moved to Amsterdam. In 1981, she returned to England, settling in Northumberland with her two sons. The family lived for ten years in a home without electricity.

Career 

France's work includes themes of landscape, nature, love and identity. In 1988 and 1989, France was awarded First Prize in the Bloodaxe Books Evening Chronicle Poetry Competition. She won a Northern Arts Fellowship at the Tyrone Guthrie Centre in Ireland in 1990.  She published her first poetry collection, Red, (Bloodaxe Books) in 1992. France was editor of the well-known anthology, Sixty Women Poets, published by Bloodaxe in 1993.

France's second collection, The Gentleness of the Very Tall, was published by Bloodaxe in 1995 and was long-listed for the Los Angeles Times Book Prize. In 1997, Bloodaxe published Storyville, a collaboration authored by France, artist Birtley Aris and musicians Keith Morris and Lewis Watson. From 1998 to 2000, France was the recipient of a seven-month residency Fellowship at Fine Arts Work Center in Provincetown, Massachusetts, a one-month Hawthornden Fellowship, twice, and a Poetry Society poet Residency in Mowbray Park, Sunderland.

Bloodaxe published, France's Simultaneous Dress in 2002. France next authored a verse biography of eighteenth-century writer, traveler, and social rebel, Lady Mary Wortley Montagu, The Toast of the Kit-Cat Club: A Life of Lady Mary Wortley Montagu. The book was published by Bloodaxe in 2005.

In 2009, book of days, (ARC Publishing), France wrote a poem daily for a year. In 2010, ARC published  France's,You are Her. Many of the poems in collection deal with France's journey of grief and healing France due to a serious horse-riding accident in 1995, and a number of deaths of close friends.

France's 2016 collection, Reading the Flowers  is an exploration of thirteen famous Botanical Gardens. The poem, Bernard and Cerinthe, included in the collection,  was awarded the National Poetry Competition in 2013.

France lives near Hadrian's Wall, near Corbridge, Northumberland. She teaches Creative Writing at  Newcastle University.

Poetry collections 
 —(2016), Reading the Flowers, ARC Publications, 
 —(2010), You are Her, ARC Publications, 
 —(2009), Book of Days, ARC Publications,  
 —(2002), The Simultaneous Dress, Bloodaxe Books 
 —(1997), Storyville, Bloodaxe Books 
 —(1995), The Gentleness of the Very Tall, Bloodaxe Books, 
 —(1992), Red, Bloodaxe Books,

Selected publications 
 —(1993), Sixty Women Poets, Bloodaxe Books, 
 —(2005), The Toast of the Kit-Cat Club, Bloodaxe Books,

Awards 
 —(2013), National Poetry Competition, Bernard and Cerinthe
 —(1997), Tyrone Guthrie Award
 —(1994),  Arts Foundation Poetry Fellowship

References 

1958 births
Living people
21st-century British writers
British women poets
People from Wallsend
Writers from Tyne and Wear
Writers from Northumberland
21st-century British women writers